Cinderella is an opera by Alma Deutscher. The libretto is based on Charles Perrault's fairy tale "Cinderella". The work was first performed in Vienna on 29 December 2016.

Plot
Deutscher's second opera is a full-length work based on the fairy tale of Cinderella, but with significant modifications of the plot, which in her version revolves around music. It is set in Deutscher's imaginary land, Transylvanian, in an opera house run by Cinderella's stepmother. The two step-sisters are talentless would-be divas. Cinderella is a talented composer, with "beautiful melodies springing into her head", but she is not allowed to perform and is slaved-worked as a copyist. Prince Theodore is a poet, who is mocked at court for his artistic leanings. In the first act, Cinderella chances upon a captivating love poem, which unbeknownst to her, was written by the Prince. She is inspired by the poem and sets it to music. Her beautiful melody is stolen by her step-sisters and performed at the singing competition during the royal ball, but with the wrong words. Finally, Cinderella herself sings her song to the prince with the right words, but unaware that he is the poet who wrote them. After Cinderella flees from the ball at midnight, the prince searches for her on the basis of a melody (rather than a glass slipper) – the haunting melody she sang as she fled. Eventually, the pair are united: "they find each other like lyrics find melody". Deutscher explained that it was important for her that Cinderella "is not just a pretty girl who cleans the floor and keeps quiet, she's clever and talented", and she wins the prince because of her talent as a composer.

Releases and updates
A chamber version of the opera was premiered in Israel in 2015, when Deutscher was 10. She finished writing the overture "just a few days before the performance". In the following year, Deutscher expanded the opera and orchestrated it for an ensemble of 20 musicians, and this expanded version premiered in Vienna in 2016 (in German), with conductor Zubin Mehta as patron of the production. Deutscher performed the solo violin part in the opera as well as the solo piano. The opera was received with jubilation by the public, and reports about it appeared in newspapers all over the world, even on the front page of the China Daily newspaper. Numerous Viennese critics expressed their astonishment at the accomplishment of Deutscher's orchestral writing, and above all at the beauty of her melodies.

Adaptions
A further elaborated version of the opera received its U.S. premiered in December 2017, in a production of Opera San José and the Packard Humanities Institute, conducted by Dame Jane Glover. As in Vienna, Deutscher performed the violin and piano solo parts herself, and she also performed an organ voluntary at the beginning of the royal wedding scene. The five original performances sold out and further performances were added. The New Criterion called it an "opera of astounding wit, craft, and musical beauty... The sheer amount of orchestral and vocal invention is stunning", and predicted that Cinderella would find its way to Broadway. The magazine Opera Today described it as "a young talent's sensational burst to prominence... a once-in-a-lifetime opera-going event that had audiences standing and cheering." The San Jose production was released on DVD by Sony Classical Records in 2018.

In 2018, the Vienna State Opera staged an adaptation for children, which ran for two sold-out seasons, and was released on DVD on the State Opera's own label.

In 2019 Deutscher further revised the opera for a new production at the Salzburg State Theatre which premiered in the season 2019/20 and was revived in 2020/21.

In October and November 2022 there were 4 performances of Cinderella on the main stage of the National Opera House in Wexford, Ireland as part of the Wexford Festival Opera 2022 season. Alma was present at the first performance, with an audience mainly of children, leaving soon afterwards to travel to San Jose.

A revival of the 2017 Opera San Jose production has been announced for November 2022, with Deutscher on the podium as musical director.

References

2016 operas
English-language operas
German-language operas
Hebrew-language operas
Operas based on fairy tales
Works based on Cinderella
Operas based on works by Charles Perrault
Operas